The Legacy of the Drow is a New York Times best-selling fantasy series by R. A. Salvatore. It is the third series following the adventures of the Forgotten Realms character Drizzt Do'Urden.

This series is followed up by the Paths of Darkness series.

Works included
The Legacy (1992)
Starless Night (1993)
Siege of Darkness (1994)
Passage to Dawn (1996)

Literary significance and reception
The Legacy, TSR's first hardcover novel, went to the top of the New York Times bestseller list within weeks of its release.

The Legacy debuted on the New York Times bestseller list at number 9.

Starless Night debuted on the New York Times bestseller list at number 12.

"Starless Night is good sword-and-sorcery fare and keeps a lively pace throughout."—Adam Paul Hunt of the Library Journal.

Siege of Darkness debuted on the New York Times bestseller list at number 13.

Passage to Dawn debuted on the New York Times bestseller list at number 13.

"The Legacy of the Drow accomplishes what it sets out to do: to provide high magic fantasy entertainment. While the quartet has its share of hiccups, they are far from ruining the book."—Jake de Oude of RPGnet.

References

External links

Book series introduced in 1992
Forgotten Realms novel series
Novels by R. A. Salvatore